Pierre Page (8 March 1927 – 20 October 2013) was a Swiss long-distance runner. He competed in the men's 5000 metres at the 1952 Summer Olympics.

References

1927 births
2013 deaths
Athletes (track and field) at the 1952 Summer Olympics
Swiss male long-distance runners
Olympic athletes of Switzerland
Place of birth missing